The 2001 edition of the Campeonato Carioca kicked off on November 15, 2000 and ended on May 27, 2001. It was the official tournament organized by FFERJ (Federação de Futebol do Estado do Rio de Janeiro, or Rio de Janeiro State Football Federation.) Only clubs based in the Rio de Janeiro State are allowed to play. Sixteen teams contested this edition. Flamengo won the title for the 27th time. no teams were relegated.

System
The tournament was divided in four stages:
 Preliminary tournament: The two teams that had been eliminated in the 2000 Taça Guanabara joined the two relegated teams of that year, Itaperuna and Serrano, and two teams from the second level: Portuguesa and São Cristóvão; each team played against each other in a double round-robin format, and the best team would qualify to the main tournament. Each team also received a number of bonus points, the distribution criteria for them remaining unclear.
 Taça Guanabara: The 12 clubs were divided into two groups of six, and the teams in each group played in a single round-robin format against each other, with the best two in each group qualifying to the Semifinals. 
 Taça Rio: The 12 clubs all played in single round-robin format against each other. 
 Finals:  The Finals would happen in two matches, both played at the Maracanã Stadium, between the champions of the Taças Guanabara and Rio.

Championship

Preliminary phase

Taça Guanabara

Group A

Group B

Semifinals

Finals

Taça Rio

Aggregate table

Finals

References

Campeonato Carioca seasons
Carioca